The 2009 Tirreno–Adriatico, the 44th running of the race, started on 11 March and finished on 17 March. The race started in Cecina and ended in San Benedetto del Tronto.  The race was the third event in the inaugural UCI World Ranking.

Stages

Stage 1
11 March 2009 — Cecina to Capannori,

Stage 2
12 March 2009 — Volterra to Marina di Carrara,

Stage 3
13 March 2009 — Fucecchio to Santa Croce sull'Arno,

Stage 4
14 March 2009 — Foligno to Montelupone,

Stage 5
15 March 2009 — Loreto Aprutino to Macerata, (TT)

Stage 6
16 March 2009 — Civitanova Marche to Camerino,

Stage 7
17 March 2009 — San Benedetto del Tronto to San Benedetto del Tronto,

Final standings

General classification

Points classification

Mountains classification

Youth Classification

Jersey progress

Withdrawals

References

External links
 Results and Photos Cyclingnews.com

Tirreno-Adriatico
Tirreno–Adriatico
Tirreno-Adriatico